The Halani is ancient and historical town in Mehrabpur Taluka, Naushahro Feroze District, Sindh, Pakistan. The Battle of Halani between Kalhoras and Talpurs was fought here and now it has status of town committee. It is well populated town of the district.

References 

Naushahro Feroze District